The Divorce (Religious Marriages) Act 2002 is an Act of the Parliament of the United Kingdom. The Act amends the Matrimonial Causes Act 1973 to allow one party to petition a court to not declare their divorce decree absolute until they have received a similar document from a religion's authority.

The Act was brought before Parliament by Andrew Dismore MP as a Private Members' Bill under the Ten Minute Rule.

The Act applies only to England and Wales.

The need for the legislation was demonstrated in the 2000 divorce case of O v O. Jewish religious law requires the consent of the husband before a wife can receive a religious divorce; without this she cannot remarry under religious law. Some husbands have refused permission for various reasons, including demanding money from the wife, but they have still received a civil divorce and all the advantages this confers, including civil remarriage. Requiring the religious notice to be presented first would prevent a husband from gaining any advantage civil divorce might grant while holding his wife to ransom.

See also 
 Civil recognition of Jewish divorce

References

External links 
 The text of the law as currently in force

Divorce law in the United Kingdom
United Kingdom Acts of Parliament 2002
Acts of the Parliament of the United Kingdom concerning England and Wales
2002 in religion
Marriage and religion